James John Fahnhorst (born November 8, 1958) is a former National Football League (NFL) linebacker from 1984 through 1990. During that span he was a member of three Super Bowl Champions and started in Super Bowl XXIII: Super Bowl XIX, Super Bowl XXIII and Super Bowl XXIV for the San Francisco 49ers. Jim grew up in St. Cloud, Minnesota and graduated from St. Cloud Tech High School.  He played college football at the University of Minnesota where he was First-team All-Big Ten at Linebacker AP/UPI in 1981. He is the younger brother of the late former 49ers' tackle Keith Fahnhorst.  Graduating with a BA in Psychology, and a minor in Criminology.

Fahnhorst also played two years in the USFL for coaching legend George Allen in the spring/summer of 1983 and 1984 for the Chicago Blitz and Arizona Wranglers.    He is currently a Financial Advisor and has coached college football at Division III Macalester College and at Wayzata and Maple Grove High Schools in the Minneapolis area.

1958 births
Living people
American football linebackers
Minnesota Golden Gophers football players
San Francisco 49ers players
Chicago Blitz players
Arizona Wranglers players
Sportspeople from St. Cloud, Minnesota
Players of American football from Minnesota